Khilkov or Khilkoff (Russian: Хилков) also written Chilkoff, Chilkov, Khilkoff, or Hilkof, is a Rurikid princely family descending from sovereign rulers of Starodub-on-the-Klyazma.

It is also a surname. Notable people with the surname include:

Andrey Khilkov (1676–1716), Prince, Russian diplomat and ambassador
Dmitry Khilkov (1858–1914), Prince, military and later a peace activist
Mikhail Khilkov (1834–1909), Prince, Russian railroad executive
Stepan Khilkov (1785–1854), Prince, eldest son of Prince Alexander Jacobovich Khilkoff and military commander